Spolia (spoils) is a Latin word that occurs in the following contexts:

Spolia, building rubble re-used
Spoils of victory, especially
Spolia opima, arms captured from the enemy commander